HMS Arethusa was a Leander-class frigate of the Royal Navy. She was, like most of the Leanders, named after a figure of mythology (the exceptions being Cleopatra and Sirius). Arethusa was built by J.S. White & Company Shipbuilders of Cowes, launched on 5 November 1963 and commissioned on 24 November 1965.

Operational service
In 1967, Arethusa deployed to the Mediterranean. At the end of 1967 she was docked down for a repair period finishing in the spring of 1968. In the same year she took part in Portsmouth 'Navy Days'. After re dedication the ship worked up at Portland, later deploying to the Mediterranean.

Later in 1969 Arethusa was deployed as West Indies guard ship.  Visits included Punta Del Garda, Bermuda, Washington DC, Norfolk Virginia, Key West, Anguilla, Antigua, St Lucia, Curaçao, St Kitts, Tortola, St Vincent, Carriacou, Nassau, Freeport Grand Bahama, transiting the Panama Canal again to San Diego and San Francisco; returning via the Panama Canal to Trinidad.  She continued to Cartagena, Dominica, St Martin, Bequia, Georgetown, Belize, Fort Lauderdale arriving in Portsmouth in April 1970. Arethusa was guard ship for the hand-over of independence to British Guiana.

In 1970, after visits to Lorient and Esbjerg, Arethusa deployed to the Far East via South Africa and her first Beira Patrol, While in the Far East she visited Penang, Singapore, Hong Kong, Nagoya, and the Philippines. On returning to Singapore she helped escort the Queen and the Duke of Edinburgh on their South East Asian tour. In 1972, Arethusa undertook a further Beira Patrol which was designed to prevent oil reaching the landlocked country of Rhodesia via the then-Portuguese colony of Mozambique. The following year, Arethusa undertook a fishery protection patrol during the Second Cod War, and during that patrol was rammed by the Icelandic gunboat Óðinn.

In 1973 Arethusa began her modernisation which included the removal of her one twin 4.5-in gun, with the Ikara anti-submarine warfare missile system taking its place. The modernisation was completed in April 1977. In that same year, Arethusa, like many Leanders, took part in the Royal Navy's Fleet Review in celebration of HM the Queen's Silver Jubilee. Between 1978 and 1981 she was commanded by Kenneth Snow. In 1979, Arethusa deployed to the Far East and Pacific.

In 1980 Arethusa underwent a refit that was completed the following year. She then joined Standing Naval Force Atlantic, a NATO multi-national squadron. In 1985, Arethusa was fitted with towed array sonar.

Fate
Arethusa was decommissioned on 4 April 1989 in Portsmouth. She was later sunk as a target in 1991.

Notes

References

 

1963 ships
Leander-class frigates
Maritime incidents in 1973
Maritime incidents in 1991
Ships sunk as targets